A rice cracker is a cracker made from rice.

Types by region

Japan 
, a dry Japanese confectionery made from rice.
Arare (food), a bite-sized Japanese rice cracker
Oriibu no hana ('olive flower')
Senbei
Kaki no tane
Katabutsu, a brand of salted fried cracker

Indonesia 
 Rengginang

See also 
Puffed grain
Puffed rice

Rice crackers